Hodeida International Airport is an airport in Hodeida, Yemen .

Airlines and destinations
As of 2021, there are no longer any scheduled services at the airport after Yemenia suspended all routes in 2015 due to the ongoing regional conflict. Previously, the airline served few domestic and international destinations from here.

Yemeni Civil War

The airport was heavily involved and the scene of the Battle of Hudaida. Saudi led coalition moved to capture the airport on the opening day of the Battle of Hudaida, which began on June 13, 2018. The airport was partially captured by coalition forces in June 2018, though Houthi forces still control part of the complex.

References

External links
Yemen Civil Aviation - Hodeida Airport

Airports in Yemen